The 1852 United States presidential election in Mississippi took place on November 2, 1852, as part of the 1852 United States presidential election. Voters chose seven representatives, or electors to the Electoral College, who voted for President and Vice President.

Mississippi voted for the Democratic candidate, Franklin Pierce, over Whig candidate Winfield Scott. Pierce won Mississippi by a margin of 21.00%.

Results

References

Mississippi
1852
1852 Mississippi elections